Siyov (also, Silov and Siov) is a village and municipality in the Lerik Rayon of Azerbaijan.  It has a population of 1,120.  The municipality consists of the villages of Siyov, Xəlfəhonu, and Akuşapeştə.

References 

Populated places in Lerik District